The Virgin and Child is a 1499–1502 oil on panel painting by Cima da Conegliano, now in the National Gallery, London, to which it was bequeathed by George Salting in 1910.

References

London 1499-1502
15th-century paintings
Collections of the National Gallery, London